"Un Amor" (meaning "One Love") is a single by the Gipsy Kings released on 8 November 1988. The song was composed by Gipsy Kings, Los Reyes, N. Reyes, T. Baliardo and J. Bouchikhi under the label of Nonesuch Records and appears on their self-titled album Gipsy Kings. The album itself was published under the same label on 22 November 1988.

The song was covered by Micheal Castaldo on his album Bergamot.

References

External links
 

1988 singles
Gipsy Kings songs
1988 songs